Heinrich Benno Möschler (28 October 1831, in Herrnhut – 21 November 1888, in Kronförstchen, near Bautzen) was a German entomologist who specialised in Lepidoptera.

Möschler was a butterfly dealer and a member of the Entomological Society of Stettin. His collections from Suriname and Puerto Rico are in the Natural History Museum, Berlin. His microlepidoptera are in the Museum of Natural History, Görlitz.

Publications
Partial list
(1876). Exotisches (Fortsetzung). Stettiner Entomologische Zeitung 37(7–9), 293–315.
(1877). Beiträge zur Schmetterlings-Fauna von Surinam. Verh. zool.-bot. Ges. Wien 26: 293–352 Möschler, 1877: Beiträge zur Schmetterlings-Fauna von Surinam Verh. zool.-bot. Ges. Wien 26: 293-352
(1878). Beiträge zur Schmetterlings-Fauna von Surinam. II. Verhandlungen der kaiserlich-königlichen zoologisch-botanischen Gesellschaft in Wien 27, 629-700.
(1884). Beiträge zur Schmetterlings-fauna des Kaffernlandes. Verhandlungen der kk Zoologisch-Botanischen Gesellschaft in Wien, 33:267–310, pl.l
(1887). Beiträge zur Schmetterlings-Fauna der Goldküste.
(1890). Die Lepidopteren-Fauna der Insel Portorico. Abhandlungen der Senkenbergischen Naturforschenden Gesellschaft, 16 : 70–360, pl.1

References
Christoph 1889: [Moschler, H. B.] Berl. Ent. Ztschr. 33 193-196
Framke, R. 1982: [Möschler, H. B.] Abh. Ber. Naturkundemus. Görlitz 56(3) 7
Möbius, E. 1943: [Moschler, H. B.] Dt. Ent. Z. Iris 57 11
Petersen, G. 1984: Grundlagen der Inventarerkundung der Oberlausitzer Kleinschmetterlinge. - Abh. Ber. Naturkundemus.  Forschungsstelle Görlitz 58(2) 49-60, 2 Portr.
Staudinger, O. 1889: [Moschler, H. B.]  Ent. Ztg. [Stettin] 50

External links
 

1831 births
1888 deaths
People from Herrnhut
People from the Kingdom of Saxony
German lepidopterists